Şenyurt is a village in the Kızıltepe District of Mardin Province in Turkey. The village is populated by Kurds of the Kîkan tribe and had a population of 1,271 in 2021.

Geography
Şenyurt is in the Kızıltepe district of Mardin Province.

History
After the First World War, the Ottoman Empire collapsed and Syria was occupied by the French army. Later, the French occupation zone became the Syrian Arab Republic. The Syria–Turkey border line follows the railroad. Like all settlements on the railroad, the southern quarters of the town are in Syria and the northern quarters are in Turkey. The southern portion in Syria is Al-Dirbasiyah.

Economy
In 2016, Turkey decided to build a wall along the border with Syria and the border gate closed in 2017, as the wall was about to be in place. Thus, the town lost an important source of revenue.

References

Syria–Turkey border crossings
Kurdish settlements in Mardin Province
Villages in Kızıltepe District